Taldora is an outback locality in the Shire of Mckinlay, Queensland, Australia. In the  Taldora had a population of 37 people.

Geography 
The Wills Developmental Road enters the locality from the south (Julia Creek) and exits to the west (Four Ways)

There are a number of mountains in the locality:

 Mount Brown 
 Mount Fort Bowen 
 Mount Little 
The locality is within the Carpentaria Coast drainage basin (also known as the Gulf Country) which ultimately flows into the Gulf of Carpentaria.

The Cloncurry River enters the locality from the south-west (Cloncurry) and exits to the west (Four Ways). The Flinders River enters the locality from the south-east (Malpas-Trenton) and traverses the north-western boundary of the locality with Four Ways before exiting to the north-west (Stokes). The Saxby River enters from the east (Malpas-Trenton) and exits to the north (Fielding).

The land use is grazing on native vegetation.

History
Taldora was a cattle station from at least 1866. In 1878 a monthly mail service was established which passed through Taldora, and in 1880 it was referred to as a township. In July 1880 a new company purchased Taldora and began developing the station.

In 1900 Taldora was affected by a drought with rats infecting its water supply and a lack of rain resulting in no grass growing on the station and its waterhole drying up for the first time since 1880. In 1916 it was reported that Taldora was supporting 30,000 head of cattle which was three times the amount of Nockatunga Station which was the largest station in the state geographically.

In early 1947 Australian Aboriginal stockman Johnny Knight set out from Taldora to walk 150 miles to Normanton and went missing. A police search was launched which extended as far as Thursday Island and in July 1947 his swag was found and in July 1948 a skeleton which was found which may have been his remains. In 1953 an elderly man, Patrick Murphy, went missing while camping near Taldora where he was employed for ringbarking.

In the  Taldora had a population of 37 people.

Economy 

There are a number of homesteads in the locality:

 Alva Downs
 Arizona
 Auckland Downs
 Balootha
 Baroona Downs
 Bauhinia Downs
 Brinard
 Byrimine
 Caleewa Downs
 Consentes
 Cremona Downs
 Dalgonally
 Dora Vale
 Etta Plains
 Euroka Springs
 Farm Camp
 Flers
 Haddington
 Kalmeta
 Keswick
 Lands End
 Lara Downs
 Lyrian
 Manfred Downs
 Monstraven
 Numil Downs
 Ouchy
 Sunny Plains
 Taldora
 Violet Vale
Taldora Station consists of a ranch which is a private property with permission being required to visit. It does not have its own address with mail instead being received at Julia Creek.

Transport 

There are a number of airstrips in the locality:

 Arizona Airstrip
 Alcyone Airstrip
 Dalgonally Airstrip
 Lyrian Airstrip
 Numil Downs Airstrip
 Millungera Airstrip
 Mullungera Airstrip
 Wallacooloobie Airstrip
 unnamed airstrip
 unnamed airstrip
 unnamed airstrip
 unnamed airstrip
 unnamed airstrip
 unnamed airstrip
 unnamed airstrip

References 

Shire of Mckinlay
Localities in Queensland